Martine Audin (born 13 June 1959) is a French gymnast. She competed in five events at the 1976 Summer Olympics.

References

External links
 

1959 births
Living people
French female artistic gymnasts
Olympic gymnasts of France
Gymnasts at the 1976 Summer Olympics
Place of birth missing (living people)